Kondeh Sukhteh (also Romanized as Kondeh Sūkhteh) is a village in Jannatabad Rural District, Salehabad County, Razavi Khorasan Province, Iran. At the 2006 census, its population was 93, in 22 families.

References 

Populated places in   Torbat-e Jam County